Jughan may refer to:
Jughan-e Bozorg, East Azerbaijan Province (جوغان - Jūghān)
Jughan-e Kuchak, East Azerbaijan Province (جوغان - Jūghān)
Jughan, Arzuiyeh, Kerman Province (جوغان - Jūghān)
Jughan, Rudbar-e Jonubi, Kerman Province (جوغن - Jūghan)

See also
Juqan